Zenda (Meaning: Flag) is a 2010 Indian Marathi-language Political drama film produced and directed by Avdhoot Gupte. The film stars Pushkar Shrotri, Rajesh Shrungarpure, Santosh Juvekar in lead roles. Gupte who is a singer and music director has also composed the music for the film.

The film depicts the journey of four young ambitious scholars to succeed in life and the impact of a split in a major political party on their journey caused by a feud between two cousins in rival political parties. The story is inspired by the real-life feud between Raj Thackeray, chief of Maharashtra Navnirman Sena (MNS) and his cousin, Uddhav Thackeray, President of Shiv Sena.

Plot
The movie is based on actual life of party workers who have aligned their loyalty towards a particular political party and also loosely based on the political family of Balasaheb Thackeray.

It highlights the glorious past of party and strong organisation fighting for Marathi community in Maharashtra, India.

The storyline depicts the plight of party workers who have aligned their loyalty towards a particular political party based on its apex leader. When the leadership baton is passed on to the next generation, one of the new leaders breaks away from the core. What follows is the rift between friends who were once bonded together by the cause led by the party and now finding themselves opposing each other.

The movie also touches on the part where political images have been built completely based on media and PR exercises. Under pressure from the media campaign managers and in an attempt to please the monitory vote banks, the ideologies behind the parties are sacrificed, leaving the purists and youth betrayed.

Amongst the betrayed are also the youth who break away to establish themselves from under the shadow of the older leadership, only to find that their good work left aside when it is time for an election ticket allotment.

Cast
 Siddharth Chandekar as Umesh Jagtap
 Neha Joshi as Pooja
 Santosh Juvekar as Santosh Shinde
 Chinmay Mandlekar as Avinash Mohite
 Sachit Patil as Aditya Pradhan
 Tejashri Pradhan  
 Pratham Patkar
 Pushkar Shrotri as Prashant Sarpotdar
 Rajesh Shringarpure as Rajesh Sarpotdar
 Shubhangi Gokhale as Santosh's Mother
 Williemgc
 Ujwala Jog as Umesh's Mother
 Ramesh Vani as Bhate

Music
The music for the songs is composed by Avdhoot Gupte.

Release
Set to release earlier, the film was stalled by protests by Swabhiman organisation headed by Nitesh Rane, son of then Maharashtra Revenue Minister Narayan Rane, for showing his father in a poor light.

References

External links
 

2010s Marathi-language films
Indian films based on actual events
Thackeray family
Shiv Sena
Maharashtra Navnirman Sena